Lyle Theodore Odelein (born July 21, 1968) is a Canadian former professional ice hockey defenceman who played for eight National Hockey League (NHL) teams in 16 seasons, and was the inaugural captain of the Columbus Blue Jackets.

Playing career
Odelein played junior hockey for the Moose Jaw Warriors before being drafted by the Montreal Canadiens in the seventh round (141st overall) in 1986.

His playing style adapted through his career; primarily used as a defensive defenceman early in his career (as well as an enforcer), but became more of a two-way threat when former Montreal Canadiens coach Jacques Demers used him on the power play.

His first NHL goal was a highlight-reel end-to-end rush against Chicago Blackhawks goalie Ed Belfour on December 19, 1991.

Odelein won the Stanley Cup with the Montreal Canadiens in 1993.

The 1993–94 NHL season marked Odelein's career highlight. He scored 11 goals, 29 assists and 40 points, all career highs, scoring 24 of those points in 26 games in February and March that season.
As well, he scored a hat trick against the St. Louis Blues and goalie Jim Hrivnak on March 9, 1994. His 5 assists on February 2, 1994, against the Hartford Whalers, tied a single-game record for a Canadiens defenseman held by Doug Harvey, which was also tied in 2004 by Sheldon Souray.

Prior to the 1996–97 season, Odelein was traded by the Canadiens to the New Jersey Devils for Stéphane Richer on August 22, 1996. In the 1999–2000 season, his fourth with the Devils, Odelein was traded by the Devils to the Phoenix Coyotes for Deron Quint and a third round selection on March 7, 2000.

Odelein's tenure with the Coyotes was short as he was claimed in the expansion draft by the Columbus Blue Jackets on June 23, 2000. He was later named the first captain of the Blue Jackets before their inaugural season in 2000–01.

During his second season in Columbus Odelein was traded to the Chicago Blackhawks for defensemen Jaroslav Špaček. The following season he was on the move again when he was traded to the Dallas Stars.  After just three regular season games and two more in the playoffs, he was done in Dallas and found himself without a guaranteed contract offer in the off-season.

Odelein's next opportunity came from the Florida Panthers who offered him a try out that proved successful and led to a $650,000 one-year contract. For the first—and only—time in his career, Odelein stayed healthy for the full season and played in all 82 games for the Panthers. The Panthers' general manager Rick Dudley expressed interest in retaining Odelein when his contract expired, however, a lockout that erased the 2004-05 NHL season, and a changing of the guard in Florida that saw Dudley replaced by Mike Keenan, spelled the end of Odelein in Florida.

Odelein's final NHL stint came with the Pittsburgh Penguins when he inked a one-year, $500,000 deal on September 2, 2005. However, he managed just 27 games before injuring his knee, gaining just a single assist, and retired from professional hockey.

Odelein finished his NHL career with 184 fights and 2,316 career penalty minutes, placing him 30th all-time.

Personal
Odelein's brother Selmar lives in Saskatchewan also and played briefly for the Edmonton Oilers before playing for Team Canada and moving to Europe. Another brother, Lee, played professionally in Europe. After retirement, Odelein spent time on his family farm in Saskatchewan and also maintains a home in Pittsburgh.  Odelein has three children, Paulyna, Dylan and Mackenzy, from a previous marriage, Andrea Scott.

In March 2018, Odelein was hospitalized and diagnosed with critical illness polyneuropathy, after falling into a coma and suffering paralysis. Odelein underwent a heart valve, liver, and kidney transplant at Allegheny General Hospital in Pennsylvania. He was released from a rehabilitation facility in July 2018 and was walking unaided by September 2018.

Career statistics

Regular season and playoffs

International

Awards and honours

See also
Fighting in ice hockey
List of NHL players with 1000 games played
List of NHL players with 2000 career penalty minutes

References

External links

1968 births
Living people
Canadian ice hockey defencemen
Canadian people of German descent
Chicago Blackhawks players
Columbus Blue Jackets players
Dallas Stars players
Florida Panthers players
Ice hockey people from Saskatchewan
Montreal Canadiens draft picks
Montreal Canadiens players
Moose Jaw Warriors players
New Jersey Devils players
Peoria Rivermen (IHL) players
Phoenix Coyotes players
Pittsburgh Penguins players
Sherbrooke Canadiens players
Stanley Cup champions